Parapolystichum acuminatum, synonym Lastreopsis acuminata, is a small plant found in eastern Australia. Common names include creeping shield fern, glossy shield fern and shiny shield fern. It is a widespread fern, often seen in wet eucalyptus forest or rainforest, usually near streams.

References

Dryopteridaceae
Flora of New South Wales
Flora of Victoria (Australia)
Flora of Queensland
Flora of Tasmania
Flora of South Australia